The Coen Cuserhof is a former orphanage in Haarlem. The complex was designed by J.A.G. van der Steur and the original maquette is on display in the Historisch Museum Haarlem.

History
The building is named after the society that ran the orphanage, the Stichting Coen Cuser Huis, which is named after the original benefactor Coen Cuser, a Haarlem knight who founded a house for the poor on the Krocht in Haarlem in 1394. That original building, the Heilige Geesthuis, has been torn down and the land is now the location of the Hofje van Oorschot. From 1765 to 1808 the Coen Cuser orphanage (also called the Burger Weeshuis) was located on the Kinderhuisvest. In 1808 the orphanage moved to the Diakonie on the Koudenhorn (currently the location of the Haarlem police headquarters).  In 1810 they moved again to the Klein Heiligland in the quarters of the former old men's almshouse (currently the location of the Frans Hals Museum).  In 1908 the orphanage moved to the Olieslagerslaan to the Coen Cuserhof, where the orphanage closed in 1988, since by then the care for most Haarlem orphans was done by the federal authorities.

Notable residents of the orphanage were Jacobus van Looy who grew up in the orphanage when it was located in the Klein Heiligland, and Miep den Oude-Snel, who wrote the book "Miep" about her experiences in the Coen Cuserhof. Until 1933 the children were still wearing uniforms with one red sleeve and one blue sleeve. The Haarlem Mennonite philanthropist Pieter Teyler van der Hulst left funds in 1778 to organize a yearly party in his name for all the orphans of Haarlem, to be held in the Doopsgezinde Weeshuis (Mennonite orphanage). The tradition was still held in Miep's time at the beginning of the 20th century, though the location had changed and was the Mennonite orphanage on the Kleine Houtweg. Miep recalled being jealous of the Mennonite orphans who had brown dresses.

References

History on website of the Coen Cuser Stichting

Buildings and structures in Haarlem
History of Haarlem
Rijksmonuments in Haarlem
Buildings and structures completed in 1908
1908 establishments in the Netherlands
20th-century architecture in the Netherlands